El Ahmadi Mosque  is a small mosque in the northern suburb of the Medina of Tunis near Bab El Khadra one of its gates .

Localization 
The mosque can be found in the Bab El Khadra street.

History 
According to the commemorative plaque at the entrance of the mosque, it was built in 1933. 
In the same plaque, a poem by Ahmed Ben Salah Al Karoui is written too. The poem praises Ahmad II of Tunis the founder of the mosque.

Etymology 
The mosque got its name from its founder Ahmad II of Tunis, one of the beys of Tunis who ruled from 1929 until his death.

References 

Mosques in Tunis
20th-century mosques